Develiköy station is  on the Southern Line of the IZBAN commuter rail system. The station was originally built in 1866 by the Oriental Railway Company and taken over by the Turkish State Railways in 1935. Develiköy was serviced by regional and inter-city trains from Izmir until 2016, when the Southern Line was extended from Cumaovası to Tepeköy. Currently all TCDD trains skip the station.

Gallery

Railway stations in İzmir Province
Railway stations opened in 1866
1866 establishments in the Ottoman Empire